Graçay is a commune in the Cher department in the Centre-Val de Loire region of France.

Geography
Junction 9 of the A20 autoroute lies within the territory of the commune.

Population

Sights
 The church of St. Martin, dating from the twelfth century.
 The church of Notre-Dame, dating from the nineteenth century.
 A dolmen known as the “Pierre Levée" or "Grosse Pierre" .
 Remains of medieval ramparts.
 The sixteenth-century chateau of Coulon.

See also
Communes of the Cher department

References

External links

Official town website 

Communes of Cher (department)